Aleksandr Ivanov (born 25 April 1993 in Nizhny Tagil) is a Russian race walker who has been banned for life. The AIU ruled in August 2022 that all results, medals, titles, points, prize money and prizes earned by Ivanov from May 7, 2012, until August 25, 2022, are null and void.

Ivanov was hit with a doping ban in March 2019 and all of his results between July 9, 2012, and August 17, 2014, were annulled meaning that he was stripped of a gold medal in the 20 kilometres walk event at the 2013 World Championships in Athletics in Moscow, Russia, as well as a 2012 World Junior Championships silver medal and 2012 European Championships silver medal.

It was found he had 4-androstene-3,6, 17-trione and androsta-1,4,6-triene-3, 17-dione in his system in a urine sample taken by the Russian Anti-Doping Agency (RUSADA) in 2012. It was only in 2017 that the World Anti-Doping Agency secured data from the Moscow laboratory, supplied by a whistleblower.

1993 births
Living people
Russian male racewalkers
World Athletics Championships medalists
World Athletics Championships athletes for Russia
People from Nizhny Tagil
European Athletics Championships medalists
Sportspeople from Sverdlovsk Oblast